Reign of Fear is the second full-length album by the German heavy metal band Rage, and the first since their renaming from Avenger to Rage. It was released in 1986. The album was remastered by Noise/Sanctuary in 2002 with slightly altered cover art, and five bonus tracks.

Track listing

Personnel
Rage
Peter "Peavy" Wagner – vocals, bass
Jochen Schroeder – guitars
Thomas Grüning – guitars
Jörg Michael – drums

Production
Ralph Hubert – producer
Karl-Ulrich Walterbach – executive producer
D.E.F. – engineer, sample sounds
Phil Lawvere – cover painting
Fred Baumgart – cover photo

References

1986 albums
Rage (German band) albums
Noise Records albums